The Prince of Wales Tower  is the oldest martello tower in North America and is located in Point Pleasant Park, Halifax Regional Municipality, Nova Scotia, Canada.  It was built in 1796 by Captain James Straton and was used as a redoubt and a powder magazine. Restored, it was designated a National Historic Site of Canada in 1943.

History
In 1796-97, Edward, Duke of Kent had a battery built to defend the point batteries. A few years later, the battery was converted to a large round stone tower known as the Prince of Wales Tower, similar to the Martello Towers built in large numbers elsewhere by the British military.  The Prince of Wales Tower is named after Edward's eldest brother, the future  George IV of the United Kingdom.

There were five Martello Towers built in Halifax, the Prince of Wales Tower being the last remaining Tower.

Structure
The Prince of Wales Tower is 26 feet high and is 72 feet in diameter. The exposed material is ironstone rubble masonry, with  walls. The tower is a squat, round structure built of stone, almost three times as wide as it is high. The original construction allowed for six mounted guns on the roof and four guns on the second storey. The second storey was intended for barrack use and the ground floor for storage. The tower is 72 feet in diameter and the walls at the base are 8 feet thick. The tower could accommodate 200 soldiers.

Further modifications were made over the next seventy years. By 1813, the Tower mounted four 6-pound guns on garrison carriages on its barrack level, two 24-pound guns on traversing platforms and six 24-pound cannonades on traversing slides on top. After 1864, the Tower was used as a self-defensible depot magazine. The roof was replaced in 2016.

Gallery

Legacy 
 namesake of Tower Road, Halifax, Nova Scotia

See also 
 Military history of Nova Scotia
 List of oldest buildings and structures in Halifax, Nova Scotia
 History of the Halifax Regional Municipality

References

Bibliography 

 Prince of Wales Tower - National Historic Site

External links 
 Prince of Wales Tower National Historic Site

Towers completed in 1796
Military history of Nova Scotia
Martello towers
National Historic Sites in Nova Scotia
1796 establishments in the British Empire